Luther University is a private university located in Giheung-gu, Yongin, South Korea. The website is www.ltu.ac.kr

History
As part of the efforts to become a fully operational church and functioning place of training, Luther Theological Academy (LTA) was established in 1966 by Rev. Dr. Won-Yong Ji (1924-2012). This laid the foundation for what would later become Luther Theological University and is currently referred to as Luther University or commonly called "LTU"

 Luther Academy on March 5, 1966
 Renamed Luther Seminary on November 17, 1980
 Luther Seminary opened on March 1, 1984
 Designated a four-year, academic school on January 18, 1986
 Reorganized as Luther Theological University on December 5, 1997
 Changed name to Luther University on June 19, 2003

Recent Challenges
Beginning in 2010 the school started to face challenges. This was especially related to the ability of the university to issue loans. The official designation became known as a "School of Education, Science and Technology, student loan restriction college. It was recognized as one of the top 30 schools to have this particular designation.
In 2015, an evaluation by the Ministry of Education rated the university in the lowest E group, resulting in the Ministry halting its monetary support and barring the University from all state-funded programs.

Campus Scenery

Nearby Locations, Education Facilities 

 Nam June Paik Art Center
 Gyeonggi-do Museum
 Gyeonggi-do Children's Museum
 Sangal Station
 GiHeung Station (Nam June Paik Art Center)\
 Sanggal Elementary School
 Bora Elementary School
 Singal High School

References

External links 
 Official website 

Yongin
Seminaries and theological colleges in South Korea
Private universities and colleges in South Korea
Universities and colleges in Gyeonggi Province
Educational institutions established in 1966
1966 establishments in South Korea